Erin Elair Moriarty (born June 24, 1994) is an American actress. She is known for her role as Annie January / Starlight in the Amazon Prime Video series The Boys (2019–present). Prior to The Boys, she had notable roles in Netflix's Jessica Jones (2015), HBO's True Detective (2014), and ABC's Red Widow (2013). Outside of television, she has appeared in acclaimed independent films The Kings of Summer and Captain Fantastic, among others.

Early life 
Moriarty was born and raised in New York City. She began acting at 11 years old, starring as Annie in a 2005 community theater production of Annie. Upon graduation from high school, she deferred attending college to pursue acting.

Career 
Moriarty was cast in her first professional roles as a teenager, acting in the television series One Life to Live and Law & Order: Special Victims Unit. Her first roles of note were as Vince Vaughn's daughter in the 2012 comedy film The Watch; Kelly, the love interest of Nick Robinson's character, in the 2013 indie comedy The Kings of Summer; and Natalie, "a daughter destined to find out who killed her father, who once had ties to organized crime", in the ABC drama series Red Widow.

She then was cast in a supporting role in the sci-fi film After the Dark, which premiered in 2013, and had a recurring role on first season of True Detective as Audrey Hart, the problem child of Woody Harrelson's character. In September 2014, Erin Moriarty was named one of the best actors under twenty years of age by IndieWire. The same year she was cast in Ouija, but her scenes were removed from the final film, following re-shoots.

In February 2015, it was announced she joined the main cast of Netflix's Jessica Jones. In the show's first season, which was released in November 2015, Moriarty played Hope, a college student whose life is ruined by Kilgrave, the main villain.

She appeared in Blood Father, a 2016 film starring Mel Gibson. Her role as Gibson's daughter in Blood Father received praise from critics such as Manohla Dargis of The New York Times, Alonso Duralde of TheWrap, and Owen Gleiberman of Variety, but Ignatiy Vishnevetsky of The A.V. Club felt she was unconvincing and Allen Salkin of the Daily News felt she was overshadowed by the likes of Gibson and William H. Macy. Later that year, she starred in the horror film Within. Moriarty also had a supporting role in the critically acclaimed film Captain Fantastic, in which she plays the love interest of George MacKay's character. For this film, she was nominated for the Screen Actors Guild Award for Outstanding Performance by a Cast in a Motion Picture.

In June 2016, she was cast in lead role the LD Entertainment feature film The Miracle Season along with Danika Yarosh and Helen Hunt; the film was released in 2018. Also in 2018, she appeared in the films The Extraordinary Journey of the Fakir and Monster Party. Later that year, she appeared in Driven which centers around the sting operation which brought down auto mogul John DeLorean; the movie premiered at the 2018 Venice Film Festival and was filmed in Puerto Rico in 2017 during Hurricane Maria.

In December 2017, she was cast as Annie January / Starlight in The Boys, Amazon Studios loosely based adaptation of Garth Ennis and Darick Robertson's comic book of the same name. The series was released July 2019. The show's second season premiered in September 2020 with a third season initially scheduled to be released in 2021, but was delayed until June 3, 2022.

Filmography

Film

Television

Music video

Discography 
The second season premiere of  The Boys featured an original song "Never Truly Vanish" on which Moriarty provided the vocals. The song was later released on the series' second season soundtrack on October 9, 2020.

References

External links 
 

1994 births
Living people
American film actresses
American television actresses
Actresses from New York City
21st-century American actresses